Discovery is an unincorporated community in Frederick County, Maryland, United States. Discovery is located along Maryland Route 194 near the southern border of Walkersville. Prior to 2010, the community was part of the Discovery-Spring Garden census-designated place.

References

Unincorporated communities in Frederick County, Maryland
Unincorporated communities in Maryland